Unite MK was a football club based in Milton Keynes, Buckinghamshire, England.

History
The club was founded in 2004 as Wolverton Town, joining the Milton Keynes Sunday League. In 2005, the club joined the North Bucks & District League. In 2012–13, the club joined the Spartan South Midlands League Division Two. In July 2016, the club renamed to Unite MK. Unite MK entered the FA Vase for the first time in 2018–19.

On 30 May 2020, Unite MK, Milton Keynes Robins and Milton Keynes Irish Veterans merged, forming Milton Keynes Irish.

Ground
The club currently play at Manor Fields in the Fenny Stratford area of Milton Keynes, having moved to the ground in 2016. Unite MK previously played at The New Park in Greenleys.

Records
Best FA Vase performance: First qualifying round, 2018–19

References

External links
Official website

2004 establishments in England
2020 disestablishments in England
Defunct football clubs in Buckinghamshire
Sport in Milton Keynes
North Bucks & District Football League
Spartan South Midlands Football League
Association football clubs established in 2004
Association football clubs disestablished in 2020